The Enchanted Gardens is a resort near Ocho Rios in St. Ann, Jamaica. There is a nature walk with a wide variety of local plants and jungle like atmosphere. There is also an exotic aviary featuring rare birds, scenic ponds and a seawater aquarium.

The resort was originally owned by former Prime Minister Edward Seaga. It was forced to close shortly after 9-11 because of debt and tax issues.

An injunction barring the sale of the Enchanted Gardens was lifted in September 2008, allowing the property to be put back on the market by its current owner the Jamaican Redevelopment Foundation.  This is the third time it has been put up for sale but the first without an injunction.  It is expected that it will be sold by July 2009.

See also
 List of hotels in Jamaica

References

External links
Aerial view

Buildings and structures in Saint Ann Parish
Hotels in Jamaica
Tourist attractions in Saint Ann Parish